Parnell Township may refer to the following townships in the United States:

 Parnell Township, Sheridan County, Kansas
 Parnell Township, Polk County, Minnesota
 Parnell Township, Traverse County, Minnesota